David Peter Stainwright (born 13 June 1948) is an English former professional footballer who played as an inside forward in the Football League for Nottingham Forest, Doncaster Rovers and York City, and in non-League football for Heanor Town.

References

1948 births
Living people
Footballers from Nottingham
English footballers
Association football forwards
Nottingham Forest F.C. players
Doncaster Rovers F.C. players
York City F.C. players
Heanor Town F.C. players
English Football League players